Cora Cross is a fictional character from the BBC soap opera EastEnders, played by Ann Mitchell. Cora is the mother of Tanya Branning (Jo Joyner), Rainie Cross (Tanya Franks) and Ava Hartman (Claire Perkins) and the grandmother of Lauren (Jacqueline Jossa) and Abi Branning (Lorna Fitzgerald). Cora initially appeared from 11 to 15 April 2011, and returned as a regular character on 28 July. Cora is described as having "a brash, outspoken attitude and does not care who she offends", deemed "an archetypal East End matriarch" and Inside Soap says that Cora is a "brash, loud lady who likes to tell everyone what she thinks and has absolutely no shame."

In May 2011, when it was confirmed that Cora would be returning to EastEnders, executive producer Bryan Kirkwood said, "We all love Cora here—actress Ann Mitchell could be one of the Walford greats". Kirkwood was keen to find a new matriarch for the show after the loss of Peggy Mitchell (Barbara Windsor) and explained that Cora is a perfect fit. Kate White of Inside Soap praised Cora and added she could watch Ann Mitchell acting "her socks off" all day long.

Mitchell took a break from the show between April and July 2015, returning for various guest stints until 15 December the same year, when she departed. It was confirmed that Mitchell was on a temporary year-long break from the serial although Cora did not return in 2016. It was announced in March 2017 that Mitchell would reprise the role and Cora returned for two appearances on 18 and 19 May. She made several further appearances until 16 February 2018, followed by two further return stints in July and November.

Storylines

2011–2015
Cora turns up at her daughter Tanya Branning's (Jo Joyner) house unannounced, and revealing that Tanya's fiancé Greg Jessop (Stefan Booth) invited her to their wedding against Tanya's wishes. Cora's other daughter, Rainie Cross (Tanya Franks) also arrives at Tanya's house, which Tanya is initially unhappy about, but Cora vouches for her by promising that she is now clean from drugs and explains that Rainie's counsellor thinks she should reconnect with her family. Tanya soon softens towards her mother and sister. On Tanya's hen night, Cora takes a dislike to Vanessa Gold (Zöe Lucker) after Vanessa laughs about them living on a council estate. The next day, Tanya's ex-husband, Max Branning (Jake Wood), goes to Tanya's house after tearing their daughter Abi Branning's (Lorna Fitzgerald) bridesmaid dress; Tanya does not want to see him so Cora attempts to sort him out. She tells Max that although the girls have his name, they are Crosses deep down. It is later revealed that Rainie is staying at Cora's house. Cora then attends Tanya's wedding, and finds it amusing when Jane Beale (Laurie Brett) says she kissed Greg the night before. Cora departs after the wedding on 15 April, and Rainie later reveals that she has moved out of her mother's home.

Cora returns months later as she can no longer handle her abusive neighbours and asks to stay with Tanya for a few days. Tanya lets her stay longer, and on her birthday, she visits The Queen Victoria public house and meets Patrick Trueman (Rudolph Walker) and Alfie Moon (Shane Richie). She gets drunk and confronts Tanya about forgetting her birthday and how she treats Rainie. Cora also guesses that Tanya does not love Greg, but Tanya denies this. Cora reveals she has been evicted from her home because her neighbour has an ASBO, but when Cora, Tanya and Rainie return there to empty the house, the neighbour reveals that Cora is the one with the ASBO. She looks after Tanya's young son Oscar Branning (Charlee and Neo Hall) but he annoys her due to the noise he makes. She leaves him to play on the stairs but he falls down them, leaving him with minor injuries.

Eventually Cora is forced to move out of Tanya's and convinces Dot Branning (June Brown) to let her stay with her and her sister Rose Cotton (Polly Perkins). She asks Anthony Moon (Matt Lapinskas) to help her move her things, saying he can keep one of her belongings as payment. He asks for her candlesticks, but she says they are the only decent thing she owns, so she lets him buy them for £200. She later finds out they could be worth £1,000, so convinces Anthony's father Eddie (David Essex) to give her an extra £300, but he believes them to be worth £8,000. Dot later kicks Cora out for laughing at her and using language that Dot dislikes. Cora arrives at Tanya's house just as Shirley Carter (Linda Henry) is throttling Rainie so Cora fends Shirley off and threatens her. Tanya then lets Cora stay with her. When Max returns because Abi is worried about Tanya, it leads to Lauren revealing that Tanya has cervical cancer and has stopped her treatment. Tanya explains that she did not tell anyone because of how it was for her when her father, William, was dying of cancer. She then tells Cora and Rainie that William did not die peacefully as they thought, but he was in constant pain so Tanya helped him to die. Cora is initially horrified, but after Tanya explains further the circumstances surrounding William's death, they reconcile.

Cora then vows to support Tanya through her illness. Cora starts voluntary work at a cancer charity shop, where she is quickly promoted to manager. Cora also returns to live with Dot and Rose. Cora suspects Max of having an affair with Roxy Mitchell (Rita Simons). Max gets Roxy to admit to Cora that she attempted to seduce him, but that he refused her. Cora then warns Roxy to stay away from Max before throwing her out. Lucy Beale (Hetti Bywater) confides in Cora as she is unsure if she will see her father again. Having smashed Cora's shop window, Sasha Dixon (Rebecca Sanneh) is made to do shifts in the shop to pay for the damage. Cora swindles funeral director Les Coker (Roger Sloman) as a means of increasing shop sales. When Lola Pearce (Danielle Harold) goes into labour, Cora helps deliver her baby daughter, Lexi.

Cora pretends to be in a relationship with Patrick at a funeral of one of his old friends. Tanya assumes the relationship is real, so Cora is angry that Tanya is interfering. Cora and Patrick then decide to start a real relationship, taking it slowly. Tanya tries to make up for upsetting Cora by replacing a bracelet she lost, but discovers a birth certificate for a sister she knew nothing about, Ava Anderton (Clare Perkins). Cora refuses to discuss the matter, until later, when she burns the birth certificate and tells Tanya that Ava died shortly after birth. Tanya asks Cora find Rainie so she can be a bridesmaid at Tanya's second wedding to Max. Rainie sends her addiction sponsor to meet Cora, who reveals that Rainie has been sober for six weeks, Rainie blames Cora for her bad behaviour and does not want any further contact with her. Cora bins Rainie's bridesmaid dress and simply tells Tanya that Rainie refused to be a bridesmaid. Cora begins behaving strangely and angrily tells Tanya the truth about Rainie.

When Patrick questions Cora about a cake she is baking, she tells him it is for Ava's birthday, she is in fact alive and she was forced to give her up for adoption by her parents because she was unmarried and the baby was mixed race. Her erratic behaviour continues and she is subsequently fired from the charity shop. Patrick reveals to Tanya that Ava is alive, so Tanya tracks her down to a school in Dalston where she works as a deputy headmistress. Tanya is shocked to discover that Ava is mixed-race and decides to leave things. However, she leaves her purse behind, and Ava returns it to Tanya's home, where Cora is horrified when she introduces herself by her name. Tanya reveals the truth, and Cora leaves after slapping Tanya for meddling in her private life. She is angry at Patrick when he says he told Tanya the truth and ends the relationship. Cora then speaks to Ava, and Ava has many questions. Ava says she thought about finding Cora before but decided against it as she wanted to keep the past in the past, and says that nothing has changed now, rejecting Cora. Ava leaves and Cora cries. Cora later goes to Ava's workplace and gives her a Christmas card, and a short while later, Ava brings one for Cora. She also reconciles with Patrick but they stay friends.

As Christmas nears, Cora reunites with Tanya, and is invited for Christmas with the Brannings. At Derek Branning's (Jamie Foreman) funeral, Cora delivers an honest eulogy. Cora comforts Tanya after she splits with Max. She befriends her grandson, Ava's son Dexter Hartman (Khali Best), who helps to bring Cora and Ava closer. Cora is a support to Tanya and Lauren while Lauren goes through alcoholism. Tanya takes Lauren away to a clinic, but Tanya does not return when Lauren does. When Dexter's father Sam James (Cornell S John) arrives, he tries to win Cora over but she sees that Ava and Dexter are upset and warns him off. Ava and Sam reunite, and Cora eventually tells Dexter, who is initially angry but comes to terms with the relationship. Cora is jealous when Patrick picks Betty Spragg (Tessa Wyatt) as his dance partner, making fun of her behind her back and angering Patrick, putting a strain on their friendship. Abi and Kim Fox (Tameka Empson) plot to get Cora and Patrick back together, locking them in a shed. Patrick ends his friendship with Betty and resumes a relationship with Cora.

When Tanya moves away from Walford, Cora continues to live with Lauren and Abi, and they are later joined by Dexter when Ava moves to Newcastle. Cora supports her granddaughters when Max is in prison for attempted murder, but following his release from prison and separation from his third wife Kirsty Branning (Kierston Wareing), he buys 5 Albert Square, and throws Cora and Dexter out, as they do nothing around the house. They move in with Patrick, but he ends his relationship with Cora in March 2014 due to her insensitive comments that she makes to Dot following the death of her son Nick Cotton (John Altman). He later tells her that she and Dexter have one month to find somewhere else. Cora steals money from the laundrette to rent a flat, but after Dot finds her stealing money from the washing machines, Cora loses hope until Stan Carter (Timothy West), who she has recently befriended agrees to give her some cash. Cora and Dexter later move into a flat together. Lauren and Abi move in with her when Max is revealed to have been having sex with Lauren's best friend, Lucy Beale (Hetti Bywater), before her recent murder. Cora becomes suspicious that Max is withholding information from the police and calls them to clarify his statement. She later warns him not to hurt Lauren and Abi any further.

Cora and Stan start dating and Stan, who has terminal prostate cancer, decides he wants to commit the time he has left with her. He surprises her with a Christmas dance, but things are ruined when Stan's ex-wife Sylvie Carter (Linda Marlowe) walks in on them together. Cora decides to move to Newcastle with Dexter and Ava, but after Stan apologises to her and goes with her to the station, she has a change of heart and decides to stay. Stan then takes Cora to a retro dance event, but Cora walks out when Sylvie arrives there. She goes back there with Babe Smith (Annette Badland) but leaves again after seeing Stan and Sylvie sharing a dance and a kiss and learning that Babe has had feelings for Stan all along.

Several weeks later, Stan invites Cora to a horse racing match in hopes of rekindling their relationship, but she turns him down as she feels she will lose him again. The same day, Stan collapses due to his cancer spreading leaving him paralysed from the waist down. Two days later, after much hesitation, Cora visits Stan in hospital to say goodbye to him, but is unperturbed by Babe's presence in caring for Stan. After Babe privately recalls to Cora how much she loved Stan from the minute she met him, Cora is surprised when Stan proposes to her. She rejects his proposal, not wanting to hurt Babe's feelings, but Babe, realising that her and Stan were never meant to be, encourages Cora to accept the proposal for his last chance of happiness. Two weeks later, Stan passes away from his cancer, devastating Cora. After his funeral, Cora departs, saying she will stay with Tanya in Exeter, and is then seen calling her and waiting for her to pick her up.

A few months later, a dishevelled Cora attends a charity drive for the homeless at the community centre, but ensures nobody sees her. When Abi calls Tanya, she discovers Cora has not visited Tanya. Abi is distressed and attempts to find her. Cora is found by Abi, Jane and Carol Jackson (Lindsey Coulson) sleeping rough in a bus shelter and at first does not recognise Abi, however, she soon returns to Walford and lives in an allotment shed and in alleyways. Babe continues to make fun of her homeless state and when Cora steals food from The Queen Vic, she humiliates Babe by exposing her past with Queenie Trott (Judy Cornwell) as a baby farmer. Eventually, Cora's friends and neighbours stage a protest, surprisingly led by Babe, at the local council's Christmas party and they are forced to house Cora.

2017–2018
When Denise Fox (Diane Parish) is referred to a food bank, she finds Cora is volunteering there so leaves. Cora persuades Denise to get some food and explains to Denise that when she first used the food bank, she was abusive, but it helped her. Denise lets Cora know that Max is back on Albert Square, so Cora goes there and sees Max on the street. She returns to Walford a month later for Abi's 21st birthday party where she tells Max that he is still a rotten cheat and he will destroy Lauren and Abi's lives again. Cora returns after Abi contacts her and tells her that Lauren is engaged to Steven Beale (Aaron Sidwell). She is furious to discover Lauren has quit her job at Weyland and Co. Furthermore, she is surprised to discover that Max is now dating Carmel Kazemi (Bonnie Langford). She tells Lauren that she knows that Lauren does not love Steven and questions whether he is controlling her. Cora then encourages Lauren to visit Tanya. When Oscar is due to visit Max for his tenth birthday, Tanya changes her mind on letting Max see him when Denise informs Cora about Max's part in conning the neighbours with Weyland & Co as a form of revenge for being falsely imprisoned for murder.

After Abi and Lauren fall off the roof of The Queen Vic, Cora visits Abi in hospital and slaps Max, blaming him for the accident. She learns that Abi is brainstem dead and will never recover. Abi is pregnant and the baby is delivered and survives. Cora is present when Abi's life support is turned off. On the day of Abi's funeral, Cora tells Max to stay away as he has damaged the family, and afterwards, she drives Tanya home. Max then names the baby Abi Branning, but Cora receives temporary custody of her. Max marries Rainie as part of a scam to gain custody of Abi, and a battle between them and Cora ensues. Cora visits with Abi one day and allows Rainie and Max to look after her overnight. Cora then offers Rainie the chance to leave Max and move to Exeter to run a tea shop and bring up Abi with Cora and Tanya. Rainie asks Cora for more, and gets her to write a cheque for £50,000, which Rainie shows to Max, saying she is turning it down as she wants to bring up Abi with Max. Rainie then calls social services and reveals Cora's bribe to them.

While looking after Abi, Cora turns her back and Abi's pram rolls into the path of a van but it is stopped just in time. When Max and Rainie receive Cora's court statement, it claims that Rainie had sex with Max's brother, Jack Branning (Scott Maslen), of which Cora has evidence. Rainie slaps Cora when she insults her in the pub, so Cora punches Rainie in the face. When Rainie tries to apologise later, Cora accuses Rainie of trying to abduct Abi and knocks her unconscious with a frying pan. The police then arrive to put Abi into temporary care.

In 2022, Cora injures her hip and is in need of an operation. This forces her to miss Dot’s funeral, which upsets her.

Character creation

Casting
Cora and her casting were announced on 21 March 2011. It was announced that award-winning actress, Ann Mitchell would be playing the role. Mitchell said of her casting "As a lifelong fan of EastEnders, I am thrilled to join the cast. I am a great fan of June Brown's [who plays Dot Branning] and am looking forward to sharing some scenes with her." Executive producer Bryan Kirkwood opined: "I'm very excited to have the much-loved Ann Mitchell joining us. Cora Cross is a formidable woman, cut from the same cloth as many glorious Walford women of the past, and Ann Mitchell is just perfect for the role." It is Mitchell's second role in EastEnders, having previously played Jane Williams from 2001 to 2002. Cora initially appeared from 11 to 15 April 2011. On 31 May 2011, it was confirmed that Cora would be returning to EastEnders as a regular character. Kirkwood said, "We all love Cora here—actress Ann Mitchell could be one of the Walford greats. She'll be returning late in the summer and is here to stay." Kirkwood added that he was keen to establish the Cross women. Mitchell was originally a guest artiste, appearing from 11 April to 15 April but was brought back as a regular character as of 28 July 2011.

In an interview with Inside Soap, the executive producer of EastEnders, Bryan Kirkwood commented: "With the loss of Barbara Windsor, I was keen to find a new matriarch for the show, and Ann Mitchell is a dream booking. I've always been a fan of her work, and with the storyline we've got planned, we'll wonder how we ever did without Cora". Discussing the permanent return of Cora, Tanya Franks commented: "Ann Mitchell isn't that scary in real life! It'll be nice to see these three crazy women as a family unit. There's room for lots more skeletons to fall out of the closet."

Personality
Cora was described as having "a brash, outspoken attitude and does not care who she offends. She also quickly puts Tanya under scrutiny, believing that success has turned her into a snob". It was said that she secretly wants to heal the rift between Tanya and Rainie. Cora has also been described as a "bolshie battleaxe". The BBC website describes Cora as "tough as old boots" and to "cross her at your peril." It continues to read: "Outwardly, Cora’s tough as old boots and doesn’t give a stuff what people think of her. But underneath all her bling and hair dye there is a sadness to her. She’s lonely, and wishes she had a relationship with her daughters Tanya and Rainie. Unpredictable Cora has lived on an estate all her life. She’s never really had any money and finds it impossible to hold down a job. Even though she’s always skint, she does enjoy the finer things in life. She’s a fan of gold, and her big earrings may even outshine some of Pat's. This lary lady won’t back down from an argument and holds life long grudges. Cross Cora at your peril!"

Inside Soap says that Cora is a "brash, loud lady who likes to tell everyone what she thinks and has absolute no shame." An EastEnders informant says: "She'll be a massive embarrassment to Tanya, who likes to think she's risen above her roots and made a better life for herself. While Cora will be pretty impressed with Tanya's lot, she'll be quick to accuse her daughter of becoming snobby and stuck-up. That'll lead to plenty of drama and lots of comedy." Mitchell said that Cora has a "gutsy spirit" and "thick skin".

Development
In an interview with Digital Spy, Jake Wood was asked what kind of a dynamic he thinks that viewers could expect from Max and Cora. He replied: "If Max does move back home, they'd potentially have to spend a lot of time together, so I think they'd have to put their differences aside for Tanya's sake. Ann Mitchell is a superb actor and Cora is a great character – a great addition to the show. I'm very happy that she's here." Also in an interview with Digital Spy, Jo Joyner commented on the relationship between Tanya and Cora at present. She said: "I think that now we've explored all of the history with Tanya's father, the two of them are in a new territory. Cora can sometimes be distant and cold, but you have to remember that they hadn't spoken for a long time. At the moment, because of Tanya's illness, Cora is being supportive and quite 'mummy' – but there's always the possibility that things could take a turn for the worse with their relationship, so I think that could change." Joyner later added: "There's some really great stuff to come with Max, Cora and Tanya and her past. It all comes to a bit of a head."

In October 2011, Daniel Kilkelly of Digital Spy reported that Max would be returning to EastEnders with his brother Derek (Jamie Foreman) and teased that Tanya will reveal a long-held family secret which will shock Cora. Tanya reveals to Cora and Rainie that she helped her father to die. Joyner stated that particularly enjoyed filming the scene where Tanya reveals the truth about her father's death. Rudolph Walker revealed in July 2012 that Cora and Patrick Trueman are to embark on a fling with each other. Upon Tanya discovering that Cora had another daughter, Mitchell said that many twists and turns will follow. She added: "The whole situation has pierced her thick skin."

Ava Hartman
In September 2012, Kilkelly reported that Tanya would discover Cora has been keeping a secret from her for years. Tanya discovers that Cora once had a daughter by the name of Ava, after coming across a birth certificate by accident. Tanya questions Cora, but she remains secretive and refuses to talk to her daughter. Cora later opens up to Tanya and tells that her daughter was called Ava, but that she died shortly after birth. It was later announced that Ava would be introduced to the show and that actress Claire Perkins had been cast in the role. Mitchell said that Cora was "forced to give up Ava" adding "The baby's father was black and he left Cora before he knew she was pregnant. She was 18 and unmarried, and at that time, having a baby in her situation was a social stigma. She was made to feel enormous shame by her parents, who forced her to give the baby up for adoption." On the subject of Cora keeping the secret for a significant amount of time, Mitchell also said that it's down to guilt and wanting things to be kept safe and uncomplicated.  Mitchell added "It's going to be mayhem. The implications will be huge. The family will want answers, and I'm sure we won't be seeing the back of Ava."

Departure and return
Mitchell took a break from the show in April 2015 and returned on a recurring basis for five months from July to December 2015. It was reported that she would make a full return after a year, however the character did not return by the end of 2016. In March 2017, it was announced she would be returning, which she did on 18 and 19 May, and again on 23 June. She returned again on 10 August.

Reception
Speaking of Cora's arrival, Jane Simon of the Daily Mirror said "Tanya's mum Cora provides a stark warning about the dangers of Botox. She turns up tonight looking like Ronald McDonald in drag – no wonder Tanya's been avoiding her." Daniel Kilkelly from Digital Spy said of Cora's guest stint, "During her brief stay on Albert Square, Cora quickly became known for her brash attitude and outspoken ways." Kate Woodward from Inside Soap said the introduction of Cora and Sylvia Goodwin (Stephanie Cole) from Coronation Street proved that soap operas need more "outspoken older women". She commented that the characters cannot resist a barb and say the things many people would not; just like "famous battleaxe" Blanche Hunt (Maggie Jones). Cora and Sylvia have the "edge" that cannot be achieved by younger characters. Woodward described Cora as rough and that she owned a "gob as scary as her slap-plastered mug". Woodward later said that "outrageous Rose is the perfect foil for caustic Cora". She named them as "the best double-act ever" and added that they deserved a whole episode dedicated to them.

Kate White from the publication later praised the character saying "All hail the new queen of soap—fabulous Cora is everything the discerning viewer could ever want." White added she could watch Mitchell acting "her socks off" all day long. The writer later said that Cora has the "undisputed title of The Biggest Hair In Soap". Michael Cregan of Inside Soap said that Cora has "proved that she isn't a woman to be messed with". He also admitted that "it was a real surprise" to see Cora's vulnerable side as she listened to the truth of her husband's supposed "peaceful death". He added that it is clear that viewers still have a lot to learn about Cora. In October 2011, Inside Soap readers voted Cora their "favourite soap battleaxe" over Sylvia Goodwin (Stephanie Cole) and Edna Birch (Shirley Stelfox). Kevin O'Sullivan of the Daily Mirror rated one of Cora's lines his favourite. Cora said "I used to be able to walk down the street and stop traffic." O'Sullivan replied: "So she was a lollipop lady." In Heat, Julie Emery called Cora "a bouffanted harridan of a mother". Simon of the Daily Mirror later hinted that "Cora has a real soft spot for bad boy Derek Branning." A writer for the Daily Mirror called Rose Cotton (Polly Perkins), Patrick Trueman (Rudolph Walker) and Cora "diamond geezers". Mitchell revealed in July 2012 that she was shocked to see that Cora has a young fanbase. She added that it is very interesting as people seem to believe there is great division between young and old people, and that youngsters respond to her because she is a tough mother and grandmother. A writer for Press Association called Cora a "larger-than-life pensioner". Mitchell received a nomination in the "Funniest Female" category at the 2012 Inside Soap Awards for her portrayal of Cora. Upon receiving the nomination, Mitchell commented "I'm chuffed to be nominated for this award, Cora's sense of humour is so dry. I love her. She's so much fun to play!"

References

External links

EastEnders characters
Television characters introduced in 2011
Female characters in television
Fictional homeless people
Fictional managers